The Chinese Taipei Volleyball Association (CTVBA) is the governing body of volleyball in Republic of China (Taiwan).

See also 
 Chinese Taipei men's national volleyball team
 Chinese Taipei women's national volleyball team

External links
 

National members of the Asian Volleyball Confederation
Volleyball
Volleyball in Taiwan